Adamson is a ghost town in Pittsburg County, Oklahoma, United States. Comprising 4 square miles, it was located between McAlester and Wilburton. The town contained 15 coal mines. Four mines were major producers.  A post office was established at Adamson, Indian Territory on March 1, 1906.  The town was named for Peter Adamson, a mine owner. It was a prosperous coal mining town before and during World War I, especially during 1913 to 1919. On September 4, 1914, Adamson was the site of one of the worst coal mine disasters in the United States. The town never recovered economically, and is now considered a ghost town. It has since been largely engulfed by Eufaula Lake.

History
At the time of its founding, Adamson was located in Gaines County, a part of the Moshulatubbee District of the Choctaw Nation.

Adamson began as a coal-mining camp about the turn of the 20th century.  Its population peaked at  about 3,500 during World War I, when it had 15 operating mines.  The Rock Island and Katy railroads both built spurs ito ship the coal. The Rock Island line was abandoned in 1902, while the Katy remained in service until 1950. 

One of the worst mining disasters in Oklahoma occurred at Mine No. 1 on September 4, 1914. It began to collapse. One of the miners reported a cracking sound about 3:30 p.m., and the mine workers were immediately ordered to evacuate. Nearly all of the miners quickly ascended to the surface, but fourteen were trapped at the lowest level, They were buried when the entire mine collapsed. Neither rescue nor recovery of bodies was possible.

The last man to come out of the mine before it completely collapsed was Anthony Benedict. He created a monument to honor the deceased miners on his farm off of the Hartshorne-Adamson Road.

A 1957 publication reported that Adamson then had about ten houses and two small grocery stores, which catered mostly to people visiting nearby Eufaula Lake. As of 2014, Anna Benedict reported that there were many families thriving in Adamson. The post office and grocery was no longer there, but a church was flourishing. A few of the original families that used to work in the mines still reside in Adamson with their families. The mines had all been closed and had filled with water.

Geography

Education
It is zoned to Hartshorne Public Schools.

References

External links
Mining Towns - Oklahoma Encyclopedia of History and Culture

Ghost towns in Oklahoma
Populated places in Pittsburg County, Oklahoma
Populated places established in 1906
Coal towns in Oklahoma
Coal mining disasters in Oklahoma
1906 establishments in Indian Territory